José María Podestá (1898–1986) was a Uruguayan writer. His work was part of the literature event in the art competition at the 1948 Summer Olympics.

References

1898 births
1986 deaths
20th-century Uruguayan male writers
Olympic competitors in art competitions
Place of birth missing